2018 FFU Regions' Cup (Kubok rehioniv FFU) is the second season of the Football Federation of Ukraine renewed competition at regional level. The competition is conducted among football teams of Oblasts (regions) composed of players who compete at oblast championships (regional competitions).

The winner of the competition will represent Ukraine at the 2019 UEFA Regions' Cup.

Tournament structure
The 2018 FFU Regions' Cup competition changed its tournament structure compare to its previous season two year ago.

This season competition is arranged in three stages. The first stage (April 24–26) will have 24 participants and organized into a mini-tournament in six groups of four with two teams that played in the 2016 final receiving a bye for the stage along with the mini tournament group winners. The second stage (May 15–17) is a group stage will have eight participants split into two groups of four with winners of each group advancing to the final game. The third stage is the final that is scheduled to take place on 20 June 2018.

Competition schedule

First stage
composition

Group1
in Ivano-Frankivsk, Khet-Tryk Stadium

Semifinals

|}

Finals

|}

Group 2

Semifinals
in Rafalivka, RAF-BRUK Stadium

|}

Final
in Vinnytsia, Olimp Stadium

|}

Group 3
 in Lyutizh, Dinaz Stadium

Semifinals

|}

Finals

|}

Group 4
in Mykolaiv, Park Peremohy Stadium (Match 1)
and Kherson, Combined Sports School (KDYuSSh) Stadium (Match 2)

Semifinals

|}

Finals
in Kherson, Combined Sports School (KDYuSSh) Stadium

|}

Group 5
in Kramatorsk, Pole u sadu Bernatskoho

Semifinals

|}

Finals

|}

Group 6
in Kharkiv, stadium of the Kharkiv National University of Internal Affairs

Semifinals

|}

Finals

|}

Notes

Second stage
All games were scheduled to be played on 15 and 16 May. For the stage qualified football teams of following regions Ivano-Frankivsk, Zhytomyr, Lviv, Kirovohrad, Sumy, Donetsk.

Group A
in Ivano-Frankivsk, Khet-Tryk Stadium

Semifinals

|}

Finals

|}

Notes

Group B
in Mykolaivka, Sumy

Semifinals

|}

Finals

|}

Notes

Final
Final was played on 23 June 2018.

Bracket

See also
 FFU Council of Regions

References

External links

UAF Regions' Cup
FFU Regions' Cup
FFU Regions' Cup